Samay Shah is an Indian television actor who is best known for the role Gogi or Gurucharan Singh Sodi in Taarak Mehta Ka Ooltah Chashmah.

References

Living people
Indian male television actors
2001 births